George Jabez Price (c. 1878 – 31 May 1938) was an English footballer of short stature who played mainly as a forward for Burslem Port Vale between 1896 and 1907.

Career
Price joined Burslem Port Vale in January 1896, and played five Second Division games in the 1895–96 season, at the end of which the club lost their Football League status. He played three league games during the club's two seasons in the Midland League, and played just one game at the Athletic Ground in the 1898–99 campaign, scoring in a 5–0 win over Wellington Town in a FA Cup qualifying game. He scored four goals in 26 league and cup games in 1899–1900, finding the net in league encounters with Small Heath, Loughborough, and Lincoln City. He was then an ever-present for the 1900–01 campaign, scoring seven league goals against: Birmingham City, Grimsby Town, Lincoln City, Chesterfield, Blackpool, and twice against Burton Swifts.

He played 42 games in 1901–02, scoring six goals, including three in the league against West Bromwich Albion, Doncaster Rovers, and Burnley, and two in the FA Cup against Wellington Town. He remained a key figure in 1902–03, scoring 10 goals in 31 games in all competitions; his league goals came against Stockport County, Manchester United, Blackpool, Woolwich Arsenal, Small Heath, Burnley, Glossop, and twice against Lincoln City. He scored seven goals in 37 appearances in 1903–04, netting against Bolton Wanderers, Grimsby Town, Leicester Fosse, Chesterfield, and twice against Blackpool; he also scored against Stockport County in an FA Cup qualifier.

He scored seven goals in 34 games in 1904–05, scoring against Grimsby Town, Liverpool, Manchester United, Doncaster Rovers, Burton United, and Chesterfield. He hit six goals in 38 games in 1905–06, finding the net in league games with Burnley, Chelsea, and Burton United; also scoring against Oxford City in the FA Cup. However, he lost his first team place by September 1906, and scored twice in just seven league games in 1906–07, against Wolverhampton Wanderers and Barnsley. He departed at the close of the season with the club in the grip of a financial crisis. He played a total of 263 games in all competitions for Port Vale, scoring 54 goals.

Career statistics
Source:

References

1870s births
1938 deaths
Footballers from Staffordshire
English footballers
Association football forwards
Port Vale F.C. players
English Football League players
Midland Football League players